Roderic Jean Brind'Amour (born August 9, 1970) is a Canadian professional ice hockey coach and former player. He is the head coach for the Carolina Hurricanes of the National Hockey League (NHL).

Brind'Amour played 20 seasons in the National Hockey League (NHL) for the St. Louis Blues, Philadelphia Flyers and Carolina Hurricanes. He captained the Hurricanes to the franchise's first Stanley Cup championship in 2006.

Playing career

Early years
Born in Ottawa but raised in Prince Rupert and Campbell River, British Columbia, Brind'Amour was drafted by the St. Louis Blues in the first round, ninth overall, of the 1988 NHL Entry Draft. He played the next season at Michigan State University.

He became known for working out constantly, earning the nickname "Rod the Bod". During his time at Michigan State, Brind'Amour would go from a game directly into the weight room, where he would undertake a strenuous workout. Spartans head coach Ron Mason said Brind'Amour's workouts became so intense they would turn the lights out on him, and when that failed to work, they would padlock the room to bar his entry.

St. Louis Blues

At the conclusion of the 1988–89 Central Collegiate Hockey Association (CCHA) season with the Spartans, Brind'Amour joined the Blues during the 1989 Stanley Cup playoffs. He made his debut in Game 5 of the Blues' division semifinals against the Minnesota North Stars, and scored a goal on his first shot. In his first full NHL season, 1989–90, Brind'Amour scored 27 points in the Blues' first 24 games and finished third on the Blues with 26 goals. For his efforts, Brind'Amour was selected to the 1989–90 All-Rookie Team. 

When the Blues lost team captain and top defenseman Scott Stevens as compensation for the free agent signing of Brendan Shanahan, they suddenly had a big hole on their defense. General Manager Ron Caron targeted Philadelphia Flyers blue liner Murray Baron as his solution.

Philadelphia Flyers
Brind'Amour was traded to the Philadelphia Flyers (along with Dan Quinn) in exchange for Murray Baron and Ron Sutter just before the start of the  1991–92 season. He spent his years in Philadelphia as an alternate to captain Kevin Dineen and then Eric Lindros, filling in as captain and wearing the "C" when the latter was out of the lineup. It was there he started his reputation of being one of the best shutdown centres of the NHL. This culminated into a Selke Trophy later awarded to him as a member of the Carolina Hurricanes in 2006 and again in 2007.

When the Flyers faced the Pittsburgh Penguins in the first round of the 1997 playoffs, Brind'Amour scored two short-handed goals during a single power play. The Flyers made it to the Stanley Cup Finals, which they lost to the Detroit Red Wings.

During his stint with Philadelphia, Brind'Amour was considered one of the NHL's "ironmen" with a consecutive games streak of 484 played, a Flyers franchise record. He culminated his career as a Flyer after 633 games with franchise records as the seventh all-time in assists with 366, tenth all time in goals with 235 and ninth overall in points with 601. He was inducted into the Flyers Hall of Fame on November 23, 2015, in a game against the Carolina Hurricanes, with whom he was an assistant coach at the time.

Carolina Hurricanes
Following his return from an ankle injury during the 1999–2000 season, Brind'Amour was traded to the Carolina Hurricanes (along with Jean-Marc Pelletier) in exchange for Keith Primeau.

Additionally, Brind'Amour was one-third of Carolina's "BBC Line", also featuring Bates Battaglia and Erik Cole, during the Hurricanes' run to the Finals in 2002. Brind'Amour was named captain of the Hurricanes before the 2005–06 season.

Brind'Amour won a Stanley Cup ring with the Hurricanes, defeating the Edmonton Oilers in the 2006 Stanley Cup Finals in seven games. During the subsequent off-season, Brind'Amour signed a five-year contract extension with the Hurricanes.

In December 2006, Brind'Amour recorded his 1,000th career NHL point, and in February 2007, he scored his 400th career goal.

On February 14, 2008, in a game against the Pittsburgh Penguins, Brind'Amour tore his anterior cruciate ligament (ACL) in the first period, ending his season. However, Brind'Amour would return for the 2008–09 season, playing in 80 games while recording 16 goals and 35 assists as the Hurricanes reached the Eastern Conference Finals.

On January 20, 2010, Brind'Amour was replaced as Hurricanes captain by Eric Staal, previously an alternate captain. Brind'Amour then served as an alternate captain for the remainder of the season. Following the conclusion of the season, Brind'Amour retired from professional hockey, having played 1,484 career NHL games, after which he moved into Hurricanes' management as a director of forwards development.
 His number 17 jersey was retired in a ceremony on February 18, 2011.  The ceremony took place prior to a game against the Philadelphia Flyers, which at the time was coached by Peter Laviolette. Thus the two teams Brind'Amour spent the bulk of his career with, as well as the coach he won the Stanley Cup with, were present to honour him. It is the third number to be officially retired by the Hurricanes since moving to Raleigh, North Carolina, after Ron Francis' number 10 and Glen Wesley's number 2.  Brind'Amour was among the last few players in the NHL who had also played in the League during the 1980s. At the time of his retirement, he finished his professional career 18th in all-time NHL games played.

Coaching career
On June 7, 2011, Brind'Amour was introduced by the Carolina Hurricanes as their assistant coach and development coach, retaining his role in developing the franchise's forwards while also spending time behind the bench in the NHL.

Brind'Amour represented the Hurricanes in a ceremony before the Charlotte Checkers' first home game as Carolina's new American Hockey League (AHL) affiliate.

On May 8, 2018, Brind'Amour was hired as the Hurricanes' head coach. In his first season as head coach, Brind'Amour guided the team to its first playoff berth in a decade, leading them to the Eastern Conference finals where they were swept by the Boston Bruins.

On April 26, 2021, Brind'Amour became the first head coach in Hurricanes history to lead the team to the playoffs in three consecutive seasons. On June 17, Brind'Amour agreed to a three-year contract extension with the Hurricanes. That same day, Brind'Amour was awarded the Jack Adams Award, given annually to the NHL's coach of the year.

Personal life
Brind'Amour was married to Kelle Sullivan Gardner, previously named Kelly Sue Gardner, with whom he had three children. The couple divorced in 2004.

On July 10, 2010, Brind'Amour married Amy Biedenbach, the daughter of former North Carolina State University basketball standout and former UNC Asheville men's basketball coach, Eddie Biedenbach. The couple have one son together.

Brind'Amour's oldest son, Skyler, was drafted by the Edmonton Oilers 177th overall in the 2017 NHL Entry Draft.

Career statistics

Regular season and playoffs

International

Head coaching record

Awards and honors

See also
 List of NHL players with 1,000 points
 List of NHL players with 1,000 games played

References

External links
 

1970 births
Living people
Athol Murray College of Notre Dame alumni
Canadian expatriate ice hockey players in Switzerland
Canadian ice hockey centres
Canadian ice hockey coaches
Carolina Hurricanes captains
Carolina Hurricanes coaches
Carolina Hurricanes players
Franco-Ontarian people
Frank Selke Trophy winners
Ice hockey people from British Columbia
Ice hockey people from Ottawa
Ice hockey players at the 1998 Winter Olympics
Jack Adams Award winners
EHC Kloten players
Michigan State Spartans men's ice hockey players
National Hockey League All-Stars
National Hockey League first-round draft picks
National Hockey League players with retired numbers
Olympic ice hockey players of Canada
People from Campbell River, British Columbia
People from Prince Rupert, British Columbia
Philadelphia Flyers players
St. Louis Blues draft picks
St. Louis Blues players
Stanley Cup champions